Simon Holmström (born 24 May 2001) is a Swedish professional ice hockey right winger for the  New York Islanders of the National Hockey League (NHL). He was selected 23rd overall by the Islanders in the 2019 NHL Entry Draft.

Playing career
Holmström first played as a youth in Sweden with hometown club, Tranås AIF, at the under-16 level. While playing beyond his age group through his youth, he was signed to continue his development with the junior teams of HV71 in 2015.

He made his professional debut with HV71 during the 2017–18 season, finishing scoreless in a single appearance.

In the following 2018–19 season, Holmström scored 7 goals and 20 points in just 21 games with HV71 of the J20 SuperElit. He also split the year in featuring in games for HV71's J18 team and their SHL team. Holmstrom added 3 points in 3 J20 playoff games.

Entering the NHL Central Scouting rankings as late first round pick, Holmström's projection rang true as he was selected at the 2019 NHL Entry Draft in the first round, 23rd overall, by the New York Islanders on 21 June 2019. After attending development camp he was later signed to a three-year, entry-level contract with the Islanders on 15 July 2019.

On 28 August 2020, Holmström returned to Sweden, joining HC Vita Hästen of the Allsvenskan on loan until the commencement of the delayed 2020–21 North American season. On 23 November, it was announced that Holmström had left Vita Hästen.

Holmström made his NHL debut on 23 November 2022, in the Islanders' 3–0 win against the Edmonton Oilers. Holmström scored his first NHL goal on 17 December 2022, in Las Vegas against the Vegas Golden Knights.

International play

Holmström made his junior international debut with Sweden at the 2019 IIHF World U18 Championships in his native Sweden. As the host team, Holmström contributed with 3 goals and 3 assists for 6 points in 7 games. He registered a goal in the gold medal game against Russia to help Sweden capture the championship, their first at the U18 level.

Career statistics

Regular season and playoffs

International

References

External links
 

2001 births
Living people
Bridgeport Islanders players
Bridgeport Sound Tigers players
HC Vita Hästen players
HV71 players
National Hockey League first-round draft picks
New York Islanders draft picks
New York Islanders players
People from Tranås Municipality
Swedish ice hockey right wingers
Sportspeople from Jönköping County